

Theodor Freiherr von Wrede (November 3, 1888 – March 30, 1973) was a German general in the Wehrmacht during World War II. He was a recipient of the Knight's Cross of the Iron Cross. Wrede retired from active service in 1944.

Awards

 Knight's Cross of the Iron Cross on 22 February 1942 as Generalleutnant and commander of 290. Infanterie-Division

References

Citations

Bibliography

 

1888 births
1973 deaths
Military personnel from Hamburg
Barons of Germany
Lieutenant generals of the German Army (Wehrmacht)
German Army personnel of World War I
Recipients of the clasp to the Iron Cross, 1st class
Recipients of the Gold German Cross
Recipients of the Knight's Cross of the Iron Cross
People from the Province of Schleswig-Holstein
Prussian Army personnel
Reichswehr personnel
German Army generals of World War II